Armitage is a surname. It may originate from West Yorkshire, England, during the Anglo-Saxon period.

Persons
Notable people with the name include: 
 Alan Armitage (born 1930), English cricketer
 Albert Armitage (1864–1943), Scottish explorer 
 Alison Armitage (born 1965), British actress
 Allan Armitage (born 1946), professor of horticulture
 Arnold Armitage (1899–1991), British-American artist and illustrator
 Bernard Armitage (1890–1976), English physician 
 Cecil Hamilton Armitage (1869–1933), British colonial official in West Africa
 Charles Armitage (1849–1917), English cricketer
 David Armitage (disambiguation), multiple people, including:
David Armitage (historian) (born 1965), British historian
David Armitage (footballer) (born 1988), Australian footballer
David Armitage Bannerman (1886–1979), British ornithologist
 Delon Armitage (born 1983), rugby union footballer 
 Edward Armitage (1817–1896), English painter
 Edward Liddall Armitage (1887–1967), English stained glass artist
 Edward Armitage (cricketer) (1891–1957), English cricketer
 Elkanah Armitage (1794–1876), English industrialist
 Ethel Armitage (1873–1957), British archer
 Flora Anne Armitage (1911–1995), British-born American biographer and novelist
 Frank Armitage (1924–2016), Australian-born American painter and muralist for Disney
 George Armitage (born 1942), American film director
 Goody Armitage (fl 1643), American innkeeper
 Guy Armitage (born 1991), English rugby union player
 Harry Armitage (1901–1973), English footballer
 Heather Armitage (born 1933), British athlete
 Iain Armitage (born 2008), American child actor 
 John Armitage (disambiguation), multiple people, including:
John Armitage (politician) (1920–2009), Australian politician
John Armitage (editor) (1910–1980), British editor of Encyclopædia Britannica
 Karole Armitage (born 1954), American dancer and choreographer
 Ken Armitage (1920–1952), English footballer
 Kenneth Armitage (1916–2002), British sculptor
 Louis Armitage (1921–2000), English footballer
 Michael Armitage (disambiguation), multiple people, including:
Michael Armitage (artist) (born 1984), Kenyan painter
Michael Armitage (politician) (born 1949), former Australian politician
Michael Armitage (RAF officer) (born 1930), Royal Air Force commander
 Norman Armitage (1907–1972), American Olympic fencer
 Peter Armitage (statistician) (born 1924), English medical statistician
 Peter Armitage (actor) (1939–2018), British actor
 Reginald Armitage (1898–1954), British composer, better known as Noel Gay
 Reginald S. Armitage (1892–1955), vice-president of forest company Price Brothers Limited, in Canada. 
 Richard Armitage (disambiguation), multiple people, including:
Richard Armitage (agent) (1928–1986), English talent agent
Richard Armitage (actor) (born 1971), English actor
Richard Armitage (politician) (born 1945), American politician
 Robert Armitage (disambiguation), multiple people, including:
Robert Armitage (politician) (1866–1944), British Member of Parliament for Leeds Central
Robert Perceval Armitage (1906–1990), British colonial administrator in Africa
Robert Armitage (GC) (1905–1982), British bomb disposal expert and George Cross recipient
 Rosemary Armitage (born 1955), Australian politician
 Simon Armitage (born 1963), British poet, novelist and playwright
 Steffon Armitage (born 1985), rugby union footballer
 Steve Armitage (born 1944), English-born Canadian sports reporter
 Thomas Armitage (1824–1890), British physician and founder of the Royal National Institute of the Blind
 Tom Armitage (1848–1922), English cricketer
 Vernon Armitage (1842–1911), English cricketer and lawyer
 William Edmond Armitage (1830–1873), American clergyman

Fictional characters
 Armitage, a character in the novel Neuromancer by William Gibson
 Armitage Hux, general of the First Order in the Star Wars sequel trilogy
 Detective-Judge Armitage, a character in a spin-off from Judge Dredd
 Frank Armitage, character played by Keith David in the film They Live.
 Mrs Armitage, eponymous heroine of a series of books by Quentin Blake
 Arthur Armitage, a character in G. K. Chesterton's short story "The Finger of Stone"
 Henry Armitage, a character in H. P. Lovecraft's story "The Dunwich Horror"
 Jake Armitage, a Shadowrunner in the SNES RPG Shadowrun (SNES)
 Naomi Armitage, an android in the anime series Armitage III
 Willy Armitage, an IMF agent in the TV series Mission: Impossible
 The Armitage family are the central antagonists of the 2017 American horror film Get Out.

References

See also

 Armitage (disambiguation)

English-language surnames